Fiona Shaw (born 16 February 1964) is a British novelist and academic. She has written a memoir as well as fiction for adults and children.

Personal life 
Shaw was born in London where she grew up the eldest of three daughters in a house in south London near the Thames. She has two daughters and currently lives in York with her partner.

Education   
Shaw attended university and earned a BA (first class) in English Literature from the University of York, an MA in American Studies from the University of Sussex, and completed her academic studies with a PhD at University of York on the American poet Elizabeth Bishop.

Career 
Alongside writing, Shaw worked part-time in bookshops, as a waitress, as a bike courier (briefly), as a copywriter for web developers, as a reader for the Aitken Alexander literary agency, and finally as a creative writing teacher. She developed and delivered Creative Writing courses in both life writing and fiction, in a range of community settings. In 2007, Shaw received a Royal Literary Fund (RLF) writing grant award, and she worked as an RLF Writing Fellow at her alma mater, University of York from 2007–2009 and then at the University of Sheffield, in the Animal and Plant Sciences Department from 2010–2012.

Her debut work the memoir, Out of Me (Penguin, 1997) shortlisted for the MIND Prize.

She has held positions at universities across Yorkshire, as Visiting Lecturer at York St John University from 2006–2012, Visiting Tutor at Hull and York Medical School (2008–2012). In 2011, she was John Tilney Writer in Residence in the Department of English and Related Literature, University of York. She has given talks and readings nationally, including literary festivals in Belfast, Beverley, Cambridge, Dartington, Derbyshire, Edinburgh, Hexham, Kendal, London, Morley and York (1997– ongoing).

Her books have been published in the USA, France, Germany and Norway and several of Shaw’s novels have been selected for nomination for the Booker Prize, the Costa Prize and the Orange Prize. A Stone’s Throw was selected for a New Writing North Read Regional award in 2012. She has been awarded several writing residences notably the Hawthornden Fellowship in 2010 and 2016 and the International Writer’s Residency in 2007 and 2016 and Arts Council England Grants for the Arts Award in 2015.

Shaw’s third novel Tell it to the Bees has been shot as a feature film, with BFI, Creative Scotland and other European funding. Directed by Annabel Jankel, it stars Anna Paquin, Holliday Grainger and 10 year old Gregor Selkirk. It premiered at the Toronto Film Festival in September 2018. It will be on general release in 2019.

Shaw currently works as Senior Lecturer in Creative Writing, Northumbria University. Her debut young adult novel, Outwalkers, was published in 2018, nominated for the 2019 CILIP Carnegie medal.  longlisted for the Brandford Boase Award 2019, and shortlisted for the YA Book Prize 2019.

Publications

Non-fiction 

 Out of Me: The Story of a Postnatal Breakdown (Penguin, 1997)

Fiction 
 The Sweetest Thing (Virago, 2003)
 The Picture She Took (Virago, 2005)
 Tell it to the Bees (Tindal Street, 2009)
 A Stone’s Throw (Serpent’s Tail, 2012)
 Outwalkers (David Fickling Books, 2018), USA publication (Scholastic, Feb 2019)

References

External links 
 Official Website
 David Fickling Books Author Profile
 Yorkshire Post interview with Sarah Walters Oct 2013

1964 births
Living people
Alumni of the University of Sussex
Alumni of the University of York
20th-century English women writers
20th-century English novelists
21st-century English women writers
Academics of Northumbria University
Academics of the University of York
Academics of the University of Sheffield
People associated with York St John University
Writers from London
English women novelists
British women academics
English LGBT novelists